The fourth competition weekend of the 2012–13 ISU Speed Skating World Cup was held in the M-Wave arena in Nagano, Japan, from Saturday, 8 December, until Sunday, 9 December 2012.

Schedule of events
Schedule of the event:

Medal summary

Men's events

Women's events

References

4
Isu World Cup, 2012-13, 4
Sports competitions in Nagano (city)
ISU Speed Skating World Cup – World Cup 4